Final league standings for the 1933-34 St. Louis Soccer League.

League standings

Top Goal Scorers

External links
St. Louis Soccer Leagues (RSSSF)
The Year in American Soccer - 1934

1933-34
1933–34 domestic association football leagues
1933–34 in American soccer
St Louis
St Louis